Giorgi Nemsadze is a Georgian rugby union player who plays as a lock and flanker for the Georgia national rugby union team.

References

Living people
People from Kutaisi
Rugby union players from Georgia (country)
1984 births
Expatriate rugby union players from Georgia (country)
Expatriate rugby union players in France
Expatriate sportspeople from Georgia (country) in France
Georgia international rugby union players
US Montauban players
SU Agen Lot-et-Garonne players
Bristol Bears players
Ospreys (rugby union) players
Rugby union locks